Darrin Steele (born March 20, 1969) is an American bobsledder. He competed at the 1998 Winter Olympics and the 2002 Winter Olympics. A native of Sherrard, Illinois, Steele graduated from Eastern Illinois University with a degree in economics. Steele was a member of the Eastern Illinois Panthers track and field team from 1989 to 1992.

References

External links
 

1969 births
Living people
American male bobsledders
Olympic bobsledders of the United States
Bobsledders at the 1998 Winter Olympics
Bobsledders at the 2002 Winter Olympics
People from Moline, Illinois
Universiade bronze medalists for the United States
Universiade medalists in athletics (track and field)
Eastern Illinois Panthers men's track and field athletes
Medalists at the 1993 Summer Universiade
American male decathletes